Paul Fenimore Clark (July 14, 1861 – June 2, 1932) was a politician in the American state of Nebraska.

Biography
Clark was born in Green Lake, Wisconsin, on July 14, 1861, the son of John Averill Clark and Laura Cornelia Pomeroy Clark. His distant relatives included William Cooper, James Fenimore Cooper and Paul Fenimore Cooper. He spent his childhood on a farm in St. Edward, Nebraska and attended the University of Nebraska. He was a member of the Masons.

After he retired around 1912, he and his wife May (née Roberts) moved to California. Clark died on June 2, 1932, in Willow Glen, San Jose, California.

Career
Clark was a member of the Nebraska House of Representatives, elected in 1896 and reelected in 1898. He was chosen Speaker for the 1899 session. He was an unsuccessful candidate for U.S. Representative from Nebraska in 1912 as a fusion candidate of the Republican and Bull Moose parties.

References

1861 births
1932 deaths
Methodists from Nebraska
20th-century Methodists
People from Green Lake, Wisconsin
Republican Party members of the Nebraska House of Representatives
People from St. Edward, Nebraska
Burials in California